Miles Julian Simon (born November 21, 1975) is an American basketball coach and former player who is the head coach for the South Bay Lakers of the NBA G League.

College career
Simon was born in Stockholm to an American father and a Norwegian mother. He played guard for the University of Arizona Wildcats men's basketball team, where he formed a formidable backcourt duo with future NBA point guard Mike Bibby. He was named the Most Outstanding Player in the 1997 NCAA tournament in which Arizona defeated three #1 seeded teams University of Kansas, University of North Carolina, and University of Kentucky in overtime to win the national championship. Simon had two 30-point performances during the 1997 NCAA tournament, including the championship game. In 2008, he was inducted into the Pac-12 Hall of Honor.

Professional career
After college, Simon played five games with the Orlando Magic during the 1999 NBA season. He played for two seasons for the Dakota Wizards of the CBA, whom he led to a CBA championship in 2002. Simon earned enough awards and honors in 2001–2002 to make him the most decorated player in CBA history. He received honors as Player of the Week four times. He was named the CBA Newcomer of the Year, the CBA MVP, and the Playoff MVP. He also holds the CBA record for most free throws made in a row at 60.

Post-playing career
In 2005, Simon was announced as an assistant coach under his collegiate head coach Lute Olson at his alma mater winning the conference championship and reaching the Elite Eight in March 2005. He remained an assistant coach until May 2008, when it was announced by the Arizona athletics department that his coaching contract would not be renewed.

Simon worked with ESPN as an analyst.

On June 27, 2017, he joined the Los Angeles Lakers as an assistant coach. In 2021, he was named the head coach of the Los Angeles Lakers' development team, the South Bay Lakers, in the NBA G League.

References

External links
 

1975 births
Living people
African-American basketball players
All-American college men's basketball players
American expatriate basketball people in Israel
American expatriate basketball people in Italy
American expatriate basketball people in Turkey
American men's basketball players
American people of Norwegian descent
Arizona Wildcats men's basketball coaches
Arizona Wildcats men's basketball players
Basket Livorno players
College basketball announcers in the United States
Dakota Wizards (CBA) players
Hapoel Holon players
Israeli Basketball Premier League players
Los Angeles Lakers assistant coaches
Maccabi Ra'anana players
National Basketball Association players from Sweden
Orlando Magic draft picks
Orlando Magic players
Pallacanestro Reggiana players
Pallacanestro Varese players
Point guards
Sportspeople from Stockholm
Tuborg Pilsener basketball players
21st-century African-American sportspeople
20th-century African-American sportspeople